Neukirchen-Gampern is a small railway station near the town of Neukirchen an der Vöckla, Upper Austria, Austria. The train services are operated by ÖBB. The station receives a limited service, in the early morning and late evening.

Train services
The station is served by the following services:

References

External links
Austrian Railway (ÖBB) website 

Railway stations in Upper Austria